Language Says It All is a 1987 American short documentary film about deaf children and their caregivers, directed by Rhyena Halpern and produced by Halpern and Megan Williams. It was nominated for an Academy Award for Best Documentary Short.

See also

List of films featuring the deaf and hard of hearing

References

External links
Language Says It All  at the Tripod Legacy Archive, National Technical Institute for the Deaf, Rochester Institute of Technology

1987 films
1987 short films
1987 documentary films
1980s short documentary films
American independent films
American short documentary films
Documentary films about children with disability
Deaf culture in the United States
Documentary films about deaf people
1987 independent films
1980s English-language films
1980s American films